Nova Vas pri Mokricah is a settlement in the Municipality of Brežice in eastern Slovenia, close to the border with Croatia. The area is part of the traditional region of Lower Carniola. During the Second World War, when it was known as Nova vas pri Bregani, it was one of five Slovene settlements annexed by the Independent State of Croatia. It is now included with the rest of the municipality in the Lower Sava Statistical Region.

Name
The name of the settlement was changed from Nova vas pri Bregani to Nova vas pri Mokricah in 1993. In the past the German name was Neudorf.

References

External links
Nova Vas pri Mokricah on Geopedia

Populated places in the Municipality of Brežice